Amphiprora is a genus of diatoms belonging to the family Amphipleuraceae.

The genus was first described by C. G. Ehrenberg in 1843.

The genus has cosmopolitan distribution.

Species:
 Amphiprora alata
 Amphiprora ornata
 Amphiprora paludosa

References

Diatoms
Diatom genera